Jette Nygaard-Andersen (born 22 October 1968) is a Danish business executive and the chief executive of Entain.

Early life 
Nygaard-Andersen was born on 22 October 1968. She has a master's degree in business, finance and economics from the University of Copenhagen.

Career 
She has chaired the Danish e-sports team owner Astralis. She has had senior roles at Modern Times Group, a Swedish media company, employed for 16 years.

In 2019, Nygaard-Andersen was appointed been a non-executive director of Entain. In January 2021, she was appointed to chief executive officer of Entain, becoming the first female CEO of a UK-listed betting company.

References

Living people
Danish chief executives
1968 births
Women chief executives
University of Copenhagen alumni